Carolina Alves may refer to:

 Carolina Cristina Alves, Brazilian-British economist
 Carolina Alves (tennis) (born 1996), Brazilian tennis player
 Jéssica Carolina Alves dos Reis (born 1993), Brazilian athlete specializing in the long jump